Carlo Nembrini (1611 – 16 August 1677) was a Roman Catholic prelate who served as Bishop of Parma (1651–1677).

Biography
Carlo Nembrini was born in Ancona, Italy in 1611.
On 1 July 1651, he was appointed during the papacy of Pope Innocent X as Bishop of Parma.
On 7 July 1652, he was consecrated bishop by Giovanni Battista Maria Pallotta, Cardinal-Priest of San Silvestro in Capite, with Ranuccio Scotti Douglas, Bishop Emeritus of Borgo San Donnino, and Patrizio Donati, Bishop Emeritus of Minori serving as co-consecrators. 
He served as Bishop of Parma until his death on 16 August 1677.
While bishop, he was the principal co-consecrator of Carlo Pio di Savoia, Bishop of Ferrara.

References

External links and additional sources
 (for Chronology of Bishops) 
 (for Chronology of Bishops) 

17th-century Italian Roman Catholic bishops
Bishops appointed by Pope Innocent X
1611 births
1677 deaths